The Pelagibacteraceae are a family in the Alphaproteobacteria composed of free-living marine bacteria.

References

Alphaproteobacteria